The Zhonggang Cihyu Temple is a Chinese temple dedicated to the Goddess Mazu, who is the Goddess of Sea and Patron Deity of fishermen, sailors and any occupations related to sea/ocean. It is located in Zhunan Township, Miaoli County, Taiwan and is also the oldest Matsu temple in Miaoli county.

History
The temple was first constructed in 1685 and was rebuilt in 1783. It was listed as third-class historical building by the Ministry of the Interior in 1985.

Transportation
The temple is accessible within walking distance west of Zhunan Station of Taiwan Railways.

See also
 Qianliyan & Shunfeng'er
 List of Mazu temples around the world
 List of temples in Taiwan
 List of tourist attractions in Taiwan

References

1685 establishments in Taiwan
Religious buildings and structures completed in 1685
Mazu temples in Miaoli County